Claus Christensen (born 5 February 1968) is a Danish freestyle swimmer. He competed in two events at the 1988 Summer Olympics.

References

External links
 

1968 births
Living people
Danish male freestyle swimmers
Olympic swimmers of Denmark
Swimmers at the 1988 Summer Olympics
Sportspeople from Odense